Clive Ronald Griffiths (born 2 April 1954), also known by the nickname of "Griff", is a Welsh former dual-code international rugby union and professional rugby league footballer who played in the 1970s and 1980s, and coached rugby union and rugby league in the 1990s, 2000s and 2010s.

Background
Clive Griffiths was born in Loughor, Swansea, he was affectionately known as "Clive the Ship" after the family pub in nearby Penclawdd, he was a pupil at Gowerton Grammar School, he is the father of the rugby league International footballers Rhys and Owain Griffiths.

International rugby union career 
He represented the Barbarians and on the international scene he was capped once against England in his last match for Wales on 17 March 1979. After winning his Wales B cap he was selected on the bench three times previously during the 1979 Five Nations but was an unused replacement.

Rugby league club career 

On 16 August 1979 he switched codes signing for St. Helens rugby league club for a world record £27,000 (based on increases in average earnings, this would be approximately £183,200 in 2015), and making his début in the 28–16 defeat by Widnes in the first round of the 1979 Lancashire County Cup at Knowsley Road, Eccleston, St Helens on Sunday 19 August 1979. In exactly 100 appearances he scored 598 points from 276 goals, 8 drop goals and 11 tries. After playing his last match for the club against Hull Kingston Rovers On 9 October 1984 he joined Salford. He also coached at St.Helens and Warrington before returning to Rugby Union.

Rugby league coaching career 

In September 1986, he returned to St. Helens to take up the position of fitness conditioner and a move into coaching the Wales national rugby league team led to some very creditable performances under his guidance including a World Cup semi-final match against the eventual winners Australia with a first half performance that gave Wales a half time lead. He spent 10 years with the Welsh rugby league team, twice guiding them to the semi-final stage of the World Cup and winning the European Championship for the first time in 57 years. He also enjoyed a spell as Great Britain rugby league coach in 1996.

Rugby union coaching career 

Whilst playing for Llanelli Griffiths took up his first senior coaching appointment in 1977 at the age of 25 for Newcastle Emlyn RFC. His first professional coaching role in union was with London Welsh for three seasons before joining Swansea as assistant coach in 2000. He later joined Mike Ruddock at the Newport Gwent Dragons again as assistant coach. Griffiths was appointed to the Wales Squad Coaching team on 1 July 2001 by Graham Henry and remained a part of the set up through the 2003 Rugby World Cup and five Six Nations campaigns, including the 2005 RBS Six Nations Grand Slam where he was credited for his part in tightening Wales' defensive line, particularly in their tackling performance against England.

In May 2006 he joined the then National One side Doncaster as director of rugby on a two-year deal, leading them to third place in National Division One.
 
Clive Griffiths joined Worcester Warriors as Head Coach and assistant to Director of Rugby Mike Ruddock in June 2007 on an initial two-year deal.

He went on to coach RGC 1404 North Wales rugby club who are being fast tracked into the Welsh Premiership.

Return to rugby league coaching 
In November 2011 Griffiths signed a 2-year deal to coach North Wales Crusaders, the rugby league side risen from the ashes of the former Super League franchise Crusaders. North Wales play in the Cooperative Championships 1 division.

After a winning eight out of 18 games, including three doubles, and just two more victories would have put in them in the end of season play-off competition. The following year The Crusaders won the double and were crowned champions and won the Northern Rail Cup and Griffiths was awarded Championship 1 Coach of the Year.

References

External links

1954 births
Living people
Barbarian F.C. players
Doncaster Knights coaches
Doncaster Knights players
Dual-code rugby internationals
Great Britain national rugby league team coaches
North Wales Crusaders coaches
People educated at Gowerton Grammar School
Rugby league centres
Rugby league fullbacks
Rugby league players from Swansea
Rugby league wingers
Rugby union fullbacks
Rugby union players from Loughor
Salford Red Devils players
South Wales RLFC (1995) coaches
St Helens R.F.C. players
Wales international rugby union players
Wales national rugby league team coaches
Wales national rugby league team players
Welsh rugby league coaches
Welsh rugby league players
Welsh rugby union coaches
Welsh rugby union players
Worcester Warriors